The 1957 Grand Prix motorcycle racing season was the ninth F.I.M. Road Racing World Championship Grand Prix season. The season consisted of six Grand Prix races in five classes: 500cc, 350cc, 250cc, 125cc and Sidecars 500cc. It began on 19 May, with German Grand Prix and ended with Nations Grand Prix in Italy on 1 September.

Season summary
1957 marked the end of a Golden Era in Grand Prix motorcycle racing. There had been an impressive variety of machinery competing during the 1950s including, works teams from AJS, Norton, Gilera, MV Agusta, Moto Guzzi, and BMW. That's six factories taking part with singles, twins and four-cylinder machines. Include privateer Nortons and Matchless and it made for a colorful competition.

Then the Italian firms dropped a bombshell by announcing they would pull out of racing at the conclusion of the 1957 season, citing escalating costs and dwindling motorcycle sales. MV Agusta initially went along with the pull out before reconsidering. The firm would go on to claim 17 consecutive 500cc crowns.

1957 would also mark a new era in other respects with the banning of the dustbin fairings due to their dangerous instability in crosswinds. Another harbinger of change was the introduction of two-stroke engines in competition. An East German firm named MZ placed respectably in races at the Nürburgring although few people viewed the two-strokes as a threat to the mighty four-strokes.

1957 Grand Prix season calendar

Standings

Scoring system
Points were awarded to the top six finishers in each race. Only the four best races were counted in all five classes: the Sidecars, 125cc, 250cc,  350cc and 500cc championships.

500cc final standings

1957 350cc Roadracing World Championship final standings

1957 250cc Roadracing World Championship final standings

1957 125cc Roadracing World Championship final standings

References

 Büla, Maurice & Schertenleib, Jean-Claude (2001). Continental Circus 1949-2000. Chronosports S.A. 

Grand Prix motorcycle racing seasons
Grand Prix motorcycle racing season